Quinn Coliseum is a basketball and volleyball arena in La Grande, Oregon which serves as the home for the Eastern Oregon Mountaineers. It was constructed in 1958 with a "wing" architecture theme. In 2007, Quinn Coliseum was renovated, which included a new bleachers, energy efficient lighting, and new indoor softball batting cages. Quinn Coliseum hosted amateur boxing matches in the 1980s. In 1986, a drowning occurred in the deep end of the pool facilities. John Norton, 45 of Baker, was discovered at the bottom of the pool by a lifeguard and was unresponsive to revive him. Quinn Coliseum is currently being rebuilt by SERA Architects from Portland. 

Quinn Coliseum seats 1,200 people.

References

Indoor arenas in Oregon
Eastern Oregon University
Sports venues completed in 1958
1958 establishments in Oregon
Basketball venues in Oregon
College basketball venues in the United States